The Last Poets is the debut studio album by spoken word recording artists The Last Poets. It was released in 1970 through Douglas Records. Recording sessions took place at Impact Sound Studio with production by East Wind Associates, managers of The Last Poets at the time of recording. The album peaked at #29 on the Billboard 200 albums chart and at #3 on the Top R&B/Hip-Hop Albums chart in the United States.

It spawned a single, "On the Subway", which was sampled by Digable Planets for their 1992 song "Rebirth of Slick (Cool Like Dat)". The songs from The Last Poets were used by various hip hop musicians, including N.W.A, Notorious B.I.G. and Brand Nubian. The track "Wake Up, Niggers" is featured on the soundtrack album to the film Performance, also released in 1970.

Critical reception 

Robert Christgau wrote of the group and the album in his 1970 column for The Village Voice:

Track listing

Personnel
Charles Davis – poet, lead vocals (tracks: 1, 5, 7, 9, 12), backing vocals
Jalaluddin Mansur Nuriddin – poet, lead vocals (tracks: 2, 6, 8, 13), backing vocals
Umar Bin Hassan – poet, lead vocals (tracks: 3, 4, 10, 11), backing vocals
Raymond "Nilaja" Hurrey – percussion
Danfort Griffiths – engineering
Doug Harris – photography

Charts

References

External links

1970 debut albums
The Last Poets albums
1970s spoken word albums
Spoken word albums by American artists